Julio Carlos Santiago "Ghito" Vernazza (23 September 1928 – 12 November 2017) was an Argentine footballer. He was a forward who played for Platense and River Plate in his native Argentina until 1956, when he moved to Italy and signed for newly promoted Serie A club Palermo. He played four seasons in Sicily, two in Serie A and two in Serie B, scoring over 50 goals and becoming one of the major players in the team history.

In 1960/1961, Vernazza played for A.C. Milan, where he obtained a second place. In 1961/1962, he moved to Vicenza, where he played two seasons before retiring in 1963 at the age of 35.

In April 2009, Palermo paid tribute to Vernazza with an official invitation in the Sicilian capital city. He was also awarded and presented to the Stadio Renzo Barbera public before the Serie A league game against Torino.

Honours
River Plate
Campeonato Argentino: 1952, 1953, 1955, 1956

Copa Dr. Carlos Ibarguren: 1952

References

External links
Argentine players in Italy at rsssf
Platense profile 
 

1928 births
2017 deaths
Footballers from Buenos Aires
Argentine footballers
Club Atlético Platense footballers
Club Atlético River Plate footballers
Palermo F.C. players
A.C. Milan players
L.R. Vicenza players
Association football forwards
Argentine Primera División players
Serie A players
Serie B players
Expatriate footballers in Italy
Argentine expatriate footballers
Argentine expatriate sportspeople in Italy